The  is an open-air railway museum located in Annaka, Gunma, Japan. It is operated by East Japan Railway Company (JR East), and was opened on 18 April 1998 on the site of the former Yokokawa motive power depot alongside the Shinetsu Main Line, which closed in October 1997.

External links
Official website

Museums in Gunma Prefecture
Museums established in 1998
Railway museums in Japan
East Japan Railway Company
1998 establishments in Japan
Annaka, Gunma